Bob Yari (born May 30, 1961) is an Iranian-born American film producer and director.

Biography
Yari was born to a Jewish family in Tehran, Iran. He grew up in New York City, and studied film in Santa Barbara. Yari has produced numerous award winning films, including Crash and The Illusionist. His directorial credits include Papa Hemingway in Cuba, and Mind Games. Yari has also produced numerous televisions series, including Yellowstone, 1883, and Mayor of Kingstown.

Bob Yari began his film career in the 1980s working for film and television producer Edgar Scherick. In 1989, he directed and produced his first film, Mind Games. Yari left the film industry in the 1990s and spent the next decade developing large scale commercial real estate projects, including Greenspoint Mall in Houston Texas. In the early 2000s, Yari returned to film and began developing, financing and producing films under four labels, including Laws of Attraction (Stratus Film), Employee of the Month (Bull’s Eye Entertainment), A Love Song for Bobby Long (El Camino Pictures), and Crash (Bob Yari Prods). Over the next decade, Yari is credited with producing over forty features, including The Painted Veil, Street Kings, Prime and the Cody Banks series. He also produced the feature documentaries Tyson, Dave Chapelle’s Block Party and Can’t Stand Losing You: Surviving the Police.

In 2016, Bob Yari returned to the director’s chair to helm the biopic Papa Hemingway in Cuba, which won the jury prize for Best World Feature at the Sonoma International Film Festival. The film was the first U.S. production in over five decades to be shot on location in Havana.

Bob Yari first began producing for television in 2008 with the series Crash, a spinoff of the Oscar winning film. Yari later partnered with 101 Studios to produce the Paramount Western series "Yellowstone," and its prequel "1883," as well as "Mayor of Kingstown." In 2022, Paramount announced that Yari would executive produce an additional slate of series, including: "1923," another chapter in the "Yellowstone" franchise starring Helen Mirren and Harrison Ford, "Land Man," starring Billy Bob Thornton, "Lioness" starring Zoe Saldaña, "Tulsa King", and the limited series "Bass Reeves," starring David Oyelowo. 

In 2021, Bob Yari published his first book, The Human Condition: A Pathway to Peace and Fulfillment, exploring a pathway to happiness rooted in a balanced lifestyle and attitude. The following year, Yari published On Creation and the Origins of Life: An Exploration of Intelligent Design, an exploration of the various possibilities and theories on the start of life on our planet.

Film credits 
He was a producer in all films unless otherwise noted.

Film

As director

Television

References

External links

1961 births
Living people
American film producers
Iranian film producers
American people of Iranian-Jewish descent
Iranian Jews
University of California, Santa Barbara alumni
Iranian diaspora film people
American independent film production company founders